Pauline Opango Lumumba (January 1, 1937 – December 23, 2014), also known as Pauline Opangu, was a Congolese activist, and the wife of Patrice Lumumba, the first Prime Minister of the Democratic Republic of Congo. She was born in Wembonyama, Sankuru, Belgian Congo.

Marriage

She married Patrice Lumumba on March 15, 1951, was his third wife, bore him four children, Patrice, Juliana, Roland and Marie-Christine. It was an at times difficult relationship, and the couple were separated by Patrice's imprisonment on more than one occasion. Pauline never remarried, reportedly because she was unable to "find someone else of the same quality".

Patrice Lumumba

Patrice Lumumba is one of the iconic figures in the decolonisation of Africa. Much of the Congo Basin was a colony of Belgium, from 1885 as a virtual private fiefdom of Leopold II, until its annexation by the Belgian state in 1908.

Patrice Lumumba helped to found the Mouvement National Congolais and was elected the first Prime Minister of the independent Republic of Congo in 1960. Within a year of his election, Patrice Lumumba was shot by firing squad after his government was overthrown in a coup d'état. A 23-year-old Pauline Lumumba watched as her husband was arrested, beaten, and taken away by his murderers.

Activism
Lumumba seemed to believe he would be killed, and wrote to Pauline encouraging her to carry on his work after his death. The letter was never sent to her; it was recovered by journalists and Pauline learned about it in news reports.

On February 14, 1961, Pauline marched through the African neighbourhoods of the city bare-breasted, accompanied by nearly 100 of her late husband's followers, to the United Nations Headquarters. The women's bare-breasted protest (men walked behind with bowed heads) was to protest Patrice Lumumba's death.  At the UN HQ Pauline, with Albert Lumumba, Joseph Lutula, and Pauline's young son, whom she carried in her arms, met with Rajeshwar Dayal, a UN representative. As a result of the meeting, the UN agreed to help find her late husband's body, which Pauline wanted to give a Christian burial to in the capital, Léopoldville. Moise Tshombe ultimately refused to return the remains.

Aftermath

Threatened by her late husband's enemies, Pauline and her children sought safety at a UN camp in Leopoldville. She later moved to Egypt with guarantees of protection under President Gamal Nasser. From Egypt she traveled to Belgium and France before returning to Congo after the government recognized Patrice Lumumba as a national hero.

Pauline Opango Lumumba lived the rest of her years in the Democratic Republic of Congo.

On December 23, 2014, at the age of 78, Pauline died while sleeping in her home in Kinshasa, Congo.

References

Works cited 
 

1937 births
2014 deaths
Democratic Republic of the Congo activists
Democratic Republic of the Congo women activists
People of the Congo Crisis
Spouses of politicians